Choe Ok-sil (born 29 January 1974) is a female North Korean recurve archer.

Choe represented her country in the individual event at the 2000 Summer Olympics. She competed in the individual recurve event and the team recurve event at the 2015 World Archery Championships in Copenhagen, Denmark.

References

External links
https://worldarchery.org/athlete/443/choe-ok-sil
https://info.ianseo.net/Search/Info.php?Id=94035
http://www.alamy.com/stock-photo-north-korean-archer-choe-ok-sil-takes-aim-during-the-womens-inidividual-118658330.html
http://www.les-sports.info/ok-sil-choe-tir-a-l-arc-spf386655.html

North Korean female archers
Living people
Place of birth missing (living people)
1974 births
Archers at the 2000 Summer Olympics
Olympic archers of North Korea
Asian Games competitors for North Korea
Archers at the 2002 Asian Games